A fidget toy is typically a small object used for pleasant but purposeless activity with the hands (manual fidgeting or stimming). Some users believe these toys help them tolerate anxiety, frustration, agitation, boredom, and excitement. They are also commonly used by those with sensory difficulties.

Fidget objects such as worry beads have long existed, but the types and popularity have dramatically increased since the fad for fidget spinners in 2017.

See also
Fidget Cube
Stress ball
Pop it (toy)
Infinity Cube
Fingears Magnetic Rings

References

Novelty items
Physical activity and dexterity toys
Sensory toys